The European Consortium for Political Research (ECPR) is a scholarly association that supports and encourages the training, research and cross-national cooperation of many thousands of academics and graduate students specialising in political science and all its sub-disciplines. ECPR membership is institutional rather than individual and, at its inception in 1970, comprised eight members (Bergen, Gothenburg, Essex, Leiden, Mannheim, Nuffield College (Oxford), Strathclyde and Paris (FNSP)). Membership has now grown to encompass more than 350 institutions throughout Europe, with associate members spread around the world.

ECPR activities include
 Organising workshops, roundtables, conferences and a biannual Methods School
 Publishing journals, books, articles and newsletters
 Providing a comprehensive European information source for political scientists through its website, electronic bulletin and online searchable databases
 Promoting teaching and training and the discipline in general through the professional journal European Political Science (EPS) and its Methods School.
Offering a range of funding schemes to help progress individual careers and to support the wider development of the discipline.

The ECPR has close links with similar organisations, such as the American Political Science Association (APSA), European national associations and the International Political Science Association (IPSA).

Events
General conference
Joint Sessions of Workshops
Methods School
Futures Lab
House Lectures

Prizes and awards
Cora Maas Award
Dirk-Berg-Schlosser Award
Hans Daalder Prize
Jean Blondel PhD Prize
Mattei Dogan Foundation Prize
Stein Rokkan Prize for Comparative Social Science Research
Rudolf Wildenmann Prize
Lifetime Achievement Award
Joni Lovenduski PhD Prize in Gender and Politics
Jacqui Briggs EPS Prize
Hedley Bull Prize in International Relations
Rising Star Award
Political Theory Prize

Publications
The following academic journals and book series are published by ECPR, in conjunction with other academic publishers:
Comparative Politics Series, with Oxford University Press
European Journal of International Relations (EJIR), with Sage
European Journal of Political Research (EJPR), with Wiley-Blackwell
European Political Science (EPS), with Palgrave Macmillan
Political Research Exchange (PRX), with Routledge Taylor & Francis
European Political Science Review (EPSR), with Cambridge University Press
The Loop, ECPR's in-house political science blog

ECPR Press
ECPR Press publishes original research across all fields of political science, international relations and political thought, without restriction in approach or regional focus. It is also open to interdisciplinary work with a predominant political dimension.

Standing Groups and Research Networks
ECPR Standing Groups encourage collaboration between scholars specialising in the same area of research. Their informal structure allows closer exchange of ideas.

Standing groups are open to individuals in ECPR member institutions as well as those from non-ECPR institutions.

References

External links

Political
Members of the International Science Council
Political science organizations
Political research institutes